The Russian Bear is a widespread symbol (generally of a Eurasian brown bear) for Russia, used in cartoons, articles and dramatic plays since as early as the 16th century, and relating alike to the Russian Empire, the Russian Provisional Government and Russian Republic, the Soviet Union, and the present-day Russian Federation.

The uses of the bear are mixed. It was often used by Westerners, in British caricatures and later also used in the United States, often not in a positive context; on occasion it was used to imply that Russia is "big, brutal and clumsy". However, Russians have also used it to represent their country, especially in the Russian Federation, where it has been used as a "symbol of national pride."

Early history

Use in Russian coat of arms 
There have been a few examples of Russians depicting bears in coat of arms. Mainly showing Polar Bears and Brown Bear. The Novgorod Oblast coat of arms and flag include two brown bears. The Republic of Marii El's coat of arms is a red bear with a sword and shield. While in the regions of Nenets Autonomous Okrug and Chukotka Autonomous Okrug, the coat of arms have polar bears. Meanwhile, the Republic of Karelia and Khabarovsk Krai also have bears in their coat of arms, albeit Black Bears. In Perm Krai and the Republic of Karelia coat of arms, there is a bear meant to symbolize how Orthodox Christianity took over from bear cults. Despite the bear having symbolism inside Russia, the local coat of arms use the bear more to reflect a region or history rather than Russia as a whole.

Beginning of the use in the West 
The idea of the Russian bear that pushes Russianness doesn't first appear in Russia but in the West. It's unknown when the Russian bear was first used in the West. One of the earliest usages of the Russian bear was from William Shakespeare's Macbeth in Act 3, Scene 4. Where Shakespeare referred to a "rugged Russian bear."

In Maps 
Multiple maps from the 17th to 20th centuries show Russia as inhibited and represented by bears. The maps started with small bears to represent Russia. The small use of the Russian bear led one scholar to suggest that the West viewed Russia as "realms for wild animals" by pointing out the comparison between the bears in Russia and the lions in North Africa. Over time these bears started to represent the entire country. In the end, the bears became connected with the idea of Russia rather than small animals on the map, especially through satirical maps.

In Cartoons 
The Russian Bear has also been depicted in political cartoons, especially in the British publication Punch. One of the earliest uses of the bear's connection to Russia was in the late 18th century when a British cartoon put Catherine the Great's head on a body of a bear ridden by the Russian General Potemkin. The Napoleonic Wars also had bears used to represent Russia alongside other animals, such as the Lion of England. In the Crimean War, Russia was portrayed as a bear multiple times, especially in Punch cartoons showing a bear holding a Turkey representing the Ottoman Empire which is given the subtitle "Turkey in danger?"  Representation of the Russian bear continued in cartoons throughout the 19th century and the early 20th century. In the First World War, many Punch cartoons referred to Russia using a bear to represent the empire.

The cartoons, however, didn't always represent Russia through war or expansion it also used the bear to describe internal problems. Sometimes the bear is shown as injured from war or internal problems. Especially after the January Uprising in Poland, where a Russian bear is fighting a woman meant to represent the Poles.

Use in the Soviet Era 
The bear image was, however, on various occasions (especially in the 20th century) also taken up by Russians themselves. Having the bear cub "Misha" as the mascot of the 1980 Moscow Olympic Games was evidently intended to counter the "big and brutal Russian Bear" image with a small, cuddly and smiling bear cub.

In Ronald Reagan's successful 1984 re-election campaign, he used the bear motif in the famous "Bear in the woods" ad, which claimed that he recognized the existence of a Soviet threat, and that his opponent denied its existence.

Use in post-1991 Russia 
After the dissolution of the Soviet Union, there was some support in the Russian Parliament for having a bear as the new Russian coat of arms – with the proposers pointing out that "Russia is anyway identified in the world with the Bear" – though eventually it was the Tsarist-era coat of arms of the double-headed eagle that was restored.

In Russia, associations with the image of the bear have received relatively mixed reactions. On one hand, Russians themselves appreciate the bear for its raw power and cunning, and bears are very often used as mascots or as a part of a design on a logo. On the other hand, the overuse of the image of the bear by foreigners visiting Russia prior to 20th century led to the image of bear being a sort of insider joke, postulating that "Russian streets are full of bears" as an example of factually inaccurate information about Russia.

Later, the bear was taken up as the symbol of the United Russia Party, which has dominated political life in Russia since the early 2000s. Coincidentally, the surname of Dmitry Medvedev, the Russian president elected in 2008, is the possessive adjective of медведь: i.e. his surname means "bear's".

Gallery

From Russia

From outside Russia

References

External links 

 
 

Bears in human culture
Political history of Russia
Social history of Russia
Russian culture
National symbols of Russia